Finless eel is a common name for several fishes and may refer to:

Apterichtus equatorialis, native to the eastern Pacific ocean
Apterichtus kendalli, native to the western Atlantic ocean